Fritz Dallmann (1923–1999) was an East German politician who served as Chairman of the Peasants Mutual Aid Association from 1982 until German reunification in 1990.

Dallmann's political career began after World War II, and he joined the SED and VdgB in 1947. He quickly became known for initiating agricultural programs throughout the GDR, and was awarded the Hero of Labour of East Germany in 1959. 

From 1986 until reunification, Dallmann was a member of the Volkskammer.

References
 Helmut Sakowski: Zwei Zentner Leichtigkeit. Berlin 1970

1923 births
1999 deaths
People from Piła County
Members of the Central Committee of the Socialist Unity Party of Germany
Party of Democratic Socialism (Germany) politicians
Members of the State Council of East Germany
Members of the 9th Volkskammer
Peasants Mutual Aid Association members
Kriegsmarine personnel
German prisoners of war in World War II
Recipients of the Patriotic Order of Merit in gold